Mill Creek is a tributary of Roaring Creek in Columbia County, Pennsylvania, in the United States. The creek is considered to be a High-Quality Coldwater Fishery and Class A Wild Trout Waters. Numerous species of macroinvertebrates inhabit it. The creek was named from the presence of a mill.

Course

Mill Creek begins on Catawissa Mountain in Roaring Creek Township. It flows south-southwest for slightly over a thousand feet before turning southwest for several tenths of a mile. It then turns west for a few tenths of a mile before turning southwest and receiving an unnamed tributary. The creek then turns west-northwest and passes through the community of Kulp. Near Kulp, it crosses State Route 2003 and flows west-southwest for approximately a mile, flowing through a valley. The creek then enters Locust Township and turns west, leaving the valley and flowing through a plain. After a few tenths of a mile, it reaches its confluence with Roaring Creek.

Tributaries
Mill Creek has two unnamed tributaries.

Hydrology
The concentration of alkalinity in the waters of Mill Creek is 11 milligrams per liter. The pH of the creek is 6.6. The total concentration of water hardness is 20 milligrams per liter. The creek is significantly impacted by agriculture.

The specific conductivity of the creek's waters is 49 micromhos.

A visual assessment of Mill Creek in October 2007 had a result of 19 out of 28. Its scores on the seven components of the assessment were mostly 3 on a scale of 1 to 4, but it also scored 2 on some components.

Mill Creek is an infertile stream with cold water.

Geography

It has a gradient of 29.8 meters per kilometer. There are deep holes on the creek, which are described as an "excellent physical habitat" in the Roaring Creek Coldwater Conservation Plan.

Watershed
The mouth of the creek is in the east-central part of Locust Township. There are forests for most of its length and also forests along most of the lengths of its unnamed tributaries. The creek is the smallest tributary of Roaring Creek.

A total of 48 percent of the length of Mill Creek is within  of a road. 82 percent is within  of a road and 90 percent is within  of one. It is difficult to access portions of Mill Creek because the entire length of the creek is on private land that is closed to the public. In 2000, the population density of the watershed was 18 people per square kilometer.

Mill Creek is in the United States Geological Survey quadrangle of Shumans. The headwaters of the creek are near the Pennsylvania State Game Lands Number 58.

History and etymology
Mill Creek is named after a mill known as the Mowrey Mill. This mill was built by Abner Hampton in 1820. Volunteers from the Roaring Creek Valley Conservation Association performed a visual assessment on the creek on October 1, 2007. However, the creek is the only stream in the watershed of Roaring Creek that was not studied by the Pennsylvania Fish and Boat Commission prior to a 2009 survey of the watershed.

Biology
Mill Creek is considered by the Pennsylvania Fish and Boat Commission to be Class A Wild Trout Waters between its headwaters and its mouth. The creek is also considered by the Pennsylvania Department of Environmental Protection to be a High-Quality Coldwater Fishery. It is inhabited by both brook trout and brown trout. A total of five species of fish inhabit the creek: brook trout, brown trout, eastern blacknose dace, white suckers, and creek chub. The Roaring Creek Coldwater Conservation Plan advises against the stocking of trout in the creek.

The biomass of wild brown trout in Mill Creek is 48.28 kilograms per hectare and the biomass of wild brown trout is 23.92 kilograms per hectare. Mill Creek is the only stream in the watershed of Roaring Creek where wild brook trout are common.

A total of 24 macroinvertebrate taxa inhabit Mill Creek. The taxa Hydropsychidae, Nigronia, and Philopotamidae are common in the creek. Macroinvertebrate taxa that are less common, but still present, include Ephemerellidae, Gomphidae, Heptageniidae, Limnephilidae, Perlidae, Perlodidae, Pteronarcyidae, and Sialidae. Rare macroinvertebrate taxa in the creek include Baetidae, Cambaridae, Dytiscidae, Ephemeridae, Isonychiidae, Leptophlebiidae, Limnephilidae, and several others.

See also
List of rivers of Pennsylvania
Lick Run (Roaring Creek), next tributary of Roaring Creek going downstream

References

External links
Map of the Roaring Creek watershed

Rivers of Columbia County, Pennsylvania
Tributaries of the Susquehanna River
Rivers of Pennsylvania